Fair is an alternative rock band currently signed to Tooth & Nail Records. It was created in 2005 from members of Aaron Sprinkle's touring band – Sprinkle, fellow Poor Old Lu alum Nick Barber, Erick Newbill, and Joey Sanchez. 

The band released their first album, The Best Worst-Case Scenario, on June 6, 2006.

Members 
 Aaron Sprinkle – guitar, lead vocals.
 Erick Newbill – guitar, vocals.
 Joey Sanchez – drums, percussion.
 Nick Barber – bass guitar, vocals.

Discography

Albums

References

External links
Official site
Official Purevolume
Official MySpace

Tooth & Nail Records artists
Musical groups established in 2005
Christian rock groups from Washington (state)
Alternative rock groups from Washington (state)
Musical groups from Seattle